Lakeview is a summer village in central Alberta located on Wabamun Lake. It is located within Parkland County.

History 
Lakeview was established on December 31, 1913 through the severance of lands from the Village of Wabamun.

Demographics 

In the 2016 Census of Population conducted by Statistics Canada, the Summer Village of Lakeview had a population of 30 living in 13 of its 23 total private dwellings, a  change from its 2011 population of 26.

See also 
List of communities in Alberta
List of summer villages in Alberta
List of resort villages in Saskatchewan

References

External links 

1913 establishments in Alberta
Edmonton Metropolitan Region
Summer villages in Alberta